Kaibarta may refer to:

 Haliya or Cāsi Kaivarta, a Bengali Hindu agriculturist caste, majority later identified as Mahishya
 Jalia Kaibarta, a Hindu fishing caste